In the period between 1257 and 1259 the Despotate of Epirus and Empire of Nicaea fought each other for Byzantine territories. Nicaea had by 1253 occupied Macedonia and Albania, and forced Despot Michael II of Epirus to submission. Michael II, fearing an Nicaean attack after Theodore II Laskaris' defeat of the Bulgarians (1255–56), allied himself with Serbian king Stefan Uroš I. The Epirotes involved chieftains in Albania in the springtime of 1257, and the Epirote and Serbian armies then coordinated their attacks. Michael regained most of Albania, then sent forces into Macedonia.

See also
Battle of Pelagonia

References

Sources

Despotate of Epirus
Empire of Nicaea
Conflicts in 1257
Conflicts in 1258
Conflicts in 1259
1257 in Europe
1258 in Europe
1259 in Europe
Albania under the Byzantine Empire
13th century in Greece
Civil wars of the Byzantine Empire
Wars involving medieval Serbian states
Rebellions in Albania